The 1976 season was the Hawthorn Football Club's 52nd season in the Victorian Football League and 75th overall. Hawthorn qualified for finals for the third consecutive season. Hawthorn qualified for the Grand Final for the second consecutive season. In the Grand Final, Hawthorn faced  for the second consecutive season. Hawthorn won their third VFL premiership defeating North Melbourne 100–70. This was their first premiership since 1971.

Fixture

Premiership season

Finals Series

Ladder

References

Hawthorn Football Club seasons